Kolonkwaneng is a village in Kgalagadi District of Botswana. It is located close to the border with South Africa and it has a primary school. The population was 599 in 2011 census.

References

Kgalagadi District
Villages in Botswana